The Ambassador Extraordinary and Plenipotentiary of the Russian Federation to Brunei Darussalam is the official representative of the President and the Government of the Russian Federation to the Sultan and the Government of Brunei.

The ambassador and his staff work at large in the Embassy of Russia in Bandar Seri Begawan.

History of diplomatic relations

In 1987, Soviet General Secretary Mikhail Gorbachev called for the establishment of diplomatic relations with Brunei. Although the Soviet ambassador to Singapore attempted to establish relations with Brunei in 1988, the Sultanate was unprepared to establish relations with the Communist state at the time. On 1 October 1991, Brunei established relations with the Soviet Union, and Soviet relations with the Sultanate were initially handled via the Soviet embassy in Kuala Lumpur, Malaysia. The first ambassadors to Brunei were non-resident ambassadors, accredited to Brunei in addition to their posts as ambassadors of Russia to Malaysia.

Representatives of the Russian Federation to Brunei (1991 – present)

References

 
Brunei
Russia